The New Exploits of Elaine is a 1915 American action film serial directed by Louis J. Gasnier, Leopold Wharton and Theodore Wharton. It is presumed to be lost.

Cast
 Pearl White as Elaine Dodge
 Creighton Hale as Walter Jameson
 Arnold Daly as Detective Craig Kennedy
 Edwin Arden as Wu Fang. Wu Fang appeared in several Pearl White serials. The name was based on a Chinese diplomat. Wu Ting Fang was a Chinese diplomat in Washington and wrote America, through the spectacles of an Oriental diplomat (excerpted in The New York Times, March 22, 1914). This was published less than a year before Arthur B. Reeve created the villain character.
 M.W. Rale as Long Sin. Long Sin, the Yellow Peril character from the first serial, became just an agent of Wu Fang in this serial.
 Bessie Wharton as Aunt Josephine
 Gazelle Marche as Innocent Inez
 Ah Ling Foo as a Chinese Heavy

Chapter titles
 The Serpent Sign
 The Cryptic Ring
 The Watching Eye
 The Vengeance of Wu Fang
 The Saving Circles
 Spontaneous Combustion
 The Ear In The Wall
 The Opium Smugglers
 The Tell-Tale Heart
 Shadows of War

See also
List of lost films
List of partially lost films

References

External links

1915 films
1915 lost films
1910s action films
American action films
American silent serial films
American black-and-white films
Films directed by Leopold Wharton
Films directed by Louis J. Gasnier
Films directed by Theodore Wharton
Lost American films
Lost action films
Pathé Exchange film serials
1910s American films